Cheleutochroa is an extinct genus of acritarchs from the Ordovician.

C. elegans was recovered from Rapla borehole in Estonia.

References

External links 

 
 Cheleutochroa at fossiilid.info

Acritarch genera
Fossils of Estonia